Geowanjal or Geo Wanjal is a village in the district of Gujrat, Pakistan. It is about 6 km from Jalalpur Jattan. It is situated near Chenab.

References

Villages in Gujrat District
 Bilal Akram warriach